Gaoligongshania megalothyrsa is a species of small, bushy mountain bamboo, in the monotypic genus Gaoligongshania. It is named after the Gaoligong Mountains, where it is endemic.

Description
Gaoligongshania megalothyrsa is an annual or perennial small bamboo, having the culms 1 to 3.5 m long and about 1 cm in diameter. The internodes are 30–35 cm in distance. Culm sheaths are persistent, yellow or green-brown in colour. Along the internodes are leathery, dense, short and spiny hairs. The auricles are well-developed, and purple in colour. Leaf sheaths are covered by white powdery material; the leaf blade is oblong-lanceolate, with long transverse and parallel veins. Anthers are yellow about 5 mm in length. Ovary is oblong. New shoots are produced during April and May, and flowering time is in October.

References

External links
Distribution map at GrassWorld
Taxonomy at UniProt
ZipcodeZoo

Bambusoideae
Monotypic Poaceae genera
Endemic flora of Yunnan
Bambusoideae genera